 is a Japanese photographer.

Born in Tokyo, Aramasa moved with his family to Manchukuo in 1940. In 1948 he moved to Sakata, Yamagata. He worked as a fashion photographer in Paris from 1973 to 1976. In 1980 he met his parents, from whom he had been separated, and started work on a photographic contribution to the effort of reuniting Japanese war orphans and their biological parents. This work branched into the photography of people of Japanese descent in Hawai'i and South America.

A Portrait of Japanese Immigrants to South America won the Domon Ken Award in 1986; Aramasa subsequently won various other awards.

Aramasa has taught at Musashino Art University from 1993.

Exhibitions

"A Portrait of Japanese Immigrants to South  America," Yurakucho Marion, Tokyo, 1986
"A Portrait of Japanese Immigrants to South  America," Hiroshima and Osaka, Japan, 1987  
"Taku Aramasa Photographs-The 80th Anniversary  of Japanese Immigration to Brazil," São Paulo Museum of Modern Art, São Paulo, 1988
"Family, Commemorative Exhibition of 'Who Am  I'," Nikon Salon, Tokyo and Osaka, 1990 
"Who Am I?- War Orphans Left in China," Tokyo Metropolitan Art Gallery, Tokyo, 1991
"Who Am I?- War Orphans Left in China," Hiroshima and Fukuoka, Japan, 1992
"Taku Aramasa Photographs: Portraits of Native America," Yuraku-cho Art Forum, Tokyo, Hakata, Nara and Takaoka, Japan, 1994
"Silent Land-Prison Camps in Siberia," Sinjuku Park Tower Gallery 1, Tokyo, 1995
"Manchuria/Siberia," Kawasaki City Museum, Kawasaki, Japan, 1996
"Silent Land-Prison Camps in Siberia," Tokyo Metropolitan Museum of Photography, Tokyo, 1997
"Aramasa Taku Photographs-America/Promised Land," Mitsumura Art Plaza, Tokyo, 2000
"11+1 Photographs," Musashino Art University, Department of Imaging Arts 10th Anniversary, Mitsumura Art Plaza, Tokyo, 2000 
"Aramasa Taku Photographs: Portraits of Japanese Immigrants," Polaroid Gallery, Tokyo, 2001
"Only Skin Deep-Changing vision of the American self," International Center of Photography, New York, NY
"Aramasa Taku-Sakura," Stephen Wirtz Gallery, San Francisco California, 2005
"Aramasa Taku Photographs-Apocalypse," Museum of Musashino Art University, Tokyo, 2006
"Aramasa Taku Photographs-America/promised Land" (platinum prints) Gallery Out of Place, Nara Japan, 2008
"Aramasa Sakura,"  Nikon Salon, Tokyo and Osaka, 2008
｢frame & vision｣ -blessing in forest- ARAMASA Taku Solo Exhibition Tokyo Gallery+BTAP, 2009
"ARAMASA Taku Photographs 2011"(Na2 Platina print) One Men Show, OUT of PLACE, Nara, 2011
"ARAMASA Taku 2012 -HRIZON-" One Men Show, Tokyo Publishing House, Tokyo, 2012
"ARAMASA Taku 2014 -HRIZON-" One Men Show,  Annely Juda Fine Art, London, 2014

Awards

28th New Artist of the Year Award, Japan Photography Association, 1978 
Grand Prize (Public Poster) at  the 1st International Triennale Toyama, 1985
the 5th Domon Ken Award, 1986  
the 10th Higashikawa Award, 1994 
the 46th Artist of the Year Award, Japan Photography Association, 1996

Collections
Center for Creative Photography, University of Arizona, Arizona  
Domon Ken Memorial Hall, Sakata, Japan  
Higashikawa Museum, Higashikawa-cho, Hokkaido, Japan  
São Paulo Museum, São Paulo, Brazil  
History Museum of Japanese Immigrants, São Paulo, Brazil 
International Center of Photography, New York, New York  
Osaka Human Rights History Museum, Osaka, Japan  
San Francisco Museum of Modern Art, San Francisco, California  
History Museum of Japanese Immigrants, San Jose, California
Tokyo Metropolitan Museum of Photography, Tokyo, Japan 
Stephen Wirtz Gallery, San Francisco, California
Gallery Out of Place, Nara, Japan
Museum of Musashino Art University, Tokyo, Japan

Books

Books by Aramasa

Gyakkō sango shō Bunka Shuppan-kyoku, 1974 
ERIKA : ARAMASA Taku Photographs, Hokuō-sha, 1976
Patricia : ARAMASA Taku Photographs, Hokuto-kikaku, 1977
AMERICAN PARODY : ARAMASA Taku Photographs, Hokuto-kikaku, 1977
Carnaval : ARAMASA Taku Photographs, Canon, 1979
To My Angels : ARAMASA Taku Photographs, Zenkoku Shuppan, 1983 
A Portrait of Japanese Immigrants to South America : ARAMASA Taku Photographs, Asahi Shinbunsha, 1985. . Text in Japanese and English (English translation by Lora Sharnoff)
Who Am I "War Orphans Left in China" : ARAMASA Taku Photographs, Who Am I Publishing Committee, 1990
Portraits of Native America : ARAMASA Taku Photographs, Kōdansha, 1993. 
The Silent Land Prison Camps in Siberia : ARAMASA Taku Photographs, Chikuma Shobō, 1995. 
America Promised Land : ARAMASA Taku Photographs, Misuzu Shobō, 2000. . Text in Japanese and English
Apocalypse : ARAMASA Taku Photographs, Musashino Art University, 2006. 
ARAMASA Taku Photographs - Apocalypse E-book : Musashino Art University, 2007
ARAMASA Taku Photographs - 1961~2006 E-book : Musashino Art University, 2007
ARAMASA SAKURA - in black box / in black room : Edition 1/1, 2010
ARAMASA Taku 2014 HORIZON Catalogue© London, Annely Juda Fine Art, 2014

Other books showing Aramasa's work
 Nihon nūdo meisakushū (日本ヌード名作集, Japanese nudes). Camera Mainichi bessatsu. Tokyo: Mainichi Shinbunsha, 1982.  Pp. 262–3 show a pair of photographs by Aramasa.

Notes

External links
Aramasa's website
Annely Juda Fine Art
SHIGERU YOKOTA Inc. / TOKYO PUBLISHING HOUSE
Musashino Art University Museum /ARAMASA’s Collection ’60～’07

Japanese photographers
People from Tokyo
1936 births
Living people
People of Manchukuo